Nicholas Kirton (born 6 May 1998) is a Barbadian cricketer. He made his List A debut for Canada in the 2018 ICC World Cricket League Division Two tournament on 8 February 2018.

On 3 June 2018, he was selected to play for the Montreal Tigers in the players' draft for the inaugural edition of the Global T20 Canada tournament. He made his first-class debut for Barbados in the 2018–19 Regional Four Day Competition on 17 January 2019.

In October 2019, he was named in Canada's squad for the 2019 ICC T20 World Cup Qualifier tournament in the United Arab Emirates. He made his Twenty20 International (T20I) debut for Canada, against Jersey, on 20 October 2019. In October 2019, he was selected to play for Barbados in the 2019–20 Regional Super50 tournament. In July 2020, he was named in the Jamaica Tallawahs squad for the 2020 Caribbean Premier League.

References

External links
 

1998 births
Living people
Barbadian cricketers
Barbados cricketers
Canadian cricketers
Canada Twenty20 International cricketers
Place of birth missing (living people)